Austraeolis is a genus of sea slugs, aeolid nudibranchs, shell-less marine gastropod molluscs in the taxonomic family Facelinidae.

Species
Species within this genus include:
 Austraeolis benthicola Burn, 1966
 Austraeolis catina Ev. Marcus & Er. Marcus, 1967
 Austraeolis ornata (Angas, 1864)
 Austraeolis stearnsi (Cockerell, 1901)
Species brought into synonymy
 Austraeolis fucia Burn, 1962: synonym of Facelina hartleyi Burn, 1962
 Austraeolis westralis Burn, 1966: synonym of Austraeolis ornata (Angas, 1864)

References

Facelinidae